It is the titular main antagonist in Stephen King's 1986 horror novel It. The character is an ancient, trans-dimensional evil entity which preys upon the children (and sometimes adults) of Derry, Maine, roughly every 27 years, using a variety of powers that include the ability to shapeshift, manipulate reality, and go unnoticed by adults. During the course of the story, It primarily appears in the form of Pennywise the Dancing Clown. "The Losers Club" first realizes Pennywise's presence because of Bill's little brother, Georgie.

King stated in a 2013 interview that he came up with the idea for Pennywise after asking himself what children feared "more than anything else in the world", and feeling that the answer was clowns. King thought of a troll like the one in the children's tale "Three Billy Goats Gruff", though he imagined it living in a sewer system rather than under a bridge.

The character was portrayed in its Pennywise form by Tim Curry in the 1990 television adaptation and by Bill Skarsgård in the 2017 film adaptation and its 2019 sequel It Chapter Two.

Appearances

Literature  
In the novel, It is a shapeshifting monster who usually takes the form of Pennywise the Dancing Clown, originating in a void containing and surrounding the Universe—a place referred to in the novel as the "Macroverse". It arrived on Earth during an asteroid impact and made its home under the land upon which Derry would later be constructed, initially preying on North American tribes. It would sleep for millions of years, then, when humans appeared in the area, It awoke and began a feeding cycle lasting about a year: feeding on people's fear and frequently assuming the shape of whatever its prey feared the most. After feeding, It resumed hibernation for approximately 30 years, before reappearing. It has a preference for children since their fears are easier to interpret and adults are more difficult to frighten while It is in physical form. It can manipulate people with weaker wills, making them indifferent to the horrific events that unfold or even serve as accomplices.

In the novel, It claims that its true name is Robert "Bob" Gray, but decided to be named “It”. Throughout the book, It is generally referred to as male due to usually appearing as Pennywise. The Losers come to believe It may be female after seeing It's form as a monstrous giant spider that lays eggs. However, It's true appearance is briefly observed by Bill Denbrough via the Ritual of Chüd as a mass of swirling destructive orange lights known as "deadlights", which inflict insanity or death on any living being that sees them directly. The only person to survive the ordeal is Bill's wife Audra Phillips, although she is rendered temporarily catatonic by the experience.

Its natural enemy is the "Space Turtle" or "Maturin", another ancient dweller of King's "Macroverse" who, eons ago, created the known universe and possibly others by vomiting them out as the result of a stomachache. The Turtle appears again in King's The Dark Tower series.  One of the novels in the series, Wizard and Glass, suggests that It, along with the Turtle, are themselves creations of a separate, omnipotent creator referred to as "the Other" (possibly Gan, who is said to have created the various universes where King's novels take place).

Throughout the novel It, some events are depicted from Pennywise's point of view, describing itself as a "superior" being, with the Turtle as an equal and humans as mere "toys". It's hibernation begins and ends with horrific events, like the mysterious disappearance of Derry Township's 300 settlers in 1740–43 or the town's later ironworks explosion. It awoke during a great storm that flooded part of the city in 1957, with Bill's younger brother Georgie the first in a line of killings before the Losers Club fight the monster, a confrontation culminating in Bill using the Ritual of Chüd to severely wound It and force It into hibernation. Continually surprised by the Losers' victory, It briefly questions its superiority before claiming that they were only lucky, as the Turtle is working through them. It is finally destroyed 27 years later in the second Ritual of Chüd, and an enormous storm damages the downtown part of Derry to symbolize It's death.

Pennywise makes a tangential appearance in King's 2011 novel 11/22/63, in which protagonist Jake Epping meets a couple of the children from It, asks them about a recent murder in their town, and learns that the murderer apparently "wasn't the clown." It also appears to Jake in the old ironworks, where it taunts Jake about "the rabbit-hole," referring to the time portal in which Jake moves from one time to another.

Film and television 
In the 1990 miniseries, Pennywise is portrayed by English actor Tim Curry. 

In the 2017 film adaptation, It Chapter One and its 2019 sequel It Chapter Two, Pennywise is portrayed by Swedish actor Bill Skarsgård. English actor Will Poulter was originally cast as Pennywise, with Curry describing the role as a "wonderful part" and wishing Poulter the best of luck, but the latter dropped out of the production due to scheduling conflicts and first film's original director Cary Fukunaga leaving the project.

The modern incarnation of Pennywise, introduced in the 2017 adaptation, appears as a background character in the family friendly live-action/animated film Space Jam: A New Legacy, which is also distributed by Warner Bros.

Reception and legacy 

Several media outlets such as The Guardian have spoken of the character, ranking it as one of the scariest clowns in film or pop culture. The Atlantic said of the character; "the scariest thing about Pennywise, though, is how he preys on children's deepest fears, manifesting the monsters they're most petrified by (something J. K. Rowling would later emulate with boggarts)." British scholar Mikita Brottman has also said of the miniseries version of Pennywise; "one of the most frightening of evil clowns to appear on the small screen" and that it "reflects every social and familial horror known to contemporary America". Author Darren Shan cited Pennywise as an inspiration behind the character Mr. Dowling in his 12.5 book serial Zom-B.

The American punk rock band Pennywise took its name from the character.

Association with 2016 clown sightings 

The character was suggested as a possible inspiration for two incidents of people dressing up as clowns in Northampton, England and Staten Island, New York, both during 2014.

In 2016, appearances of "evil clowns" were reported by the media, including nine people in Alabama charged with "clown-related activity". Several newspaper articles suggested that the character of Pennywise was an influence, which led to King commenting that people should react less hysterically to the sightings and not take his work seriously.

The first reported sighting of people dressed as evil clowns in Greenville, South Carolina was by a small boy spoke to his mother of a pair of clowns that had attempted to lure him away. Additional creepy clown sightings were reported in other parts of South Carolina.

Evil clowns were reported in several other U.S. states including North Carolina, Kentucky, Pennsylvania, and Wyoming Later the same year, "clown sightings" were reported in Great Britain, Australia, and Latin America.

One hypothesis for the wave of 2016 clown sightings was a viral marketing campaign, possibly for the Rob Zombie film 31 (2016). A spokesperson for New Line Cinema (distributor of the 2017 film adaptation of It) released a statement claiming that "New Line is absolutely not involved in the rash of clown sightings."

See also 

Apex predator
Evil clown
Joker
Monster
Tsuchigumo

References

External links 

It on IMDb

Characters in American novels of the 20th century
Extraterrestrial supervillains
Fictional characters who can move at superhuman speeds
Fictional characters with spirit possession or body swapping abilities
Fictional characters with superhuman strength
Fictional serial killers
Fictional murderers of children
Fictional clowns
Fictional demons and devils
Fictional extraterrestrial characters
Fictional mass murderers
Fictional monsters
Fictional shapeshifters
Fictional spiders
Fictional telepaths
Fictional torturers
Horror film villains
Horror television characters
It (novel)
Film and television memes
Internet memes introduced in 2017
Literary characters introduced in 1986
Literary villains
Stephen King characters
Film supervillains